This is a list of blockhouses built by the British Empire in South Africa during the Second Anglo-Boer War from 1899–1901. Of the fortifications constructed during the war, around 441 were solid masonry blockhouses, many of which stand today. Different designs were used in the construction, but most were either two or three story structures built using locally quarried stone.

 Aliwal North Blockhouses (2)
 Broederstroom Blockhouse
 Burgersdorp Blockhouse
 Dewetsville Blockhouse
 Fort Harlech, Krugersdorp
 Hekpoort Blockhouse
 Hopetown Blockhouse
 Kaalfontein/Zuurfontein Blockhouse
 Modder River Blockhouse
 Noupoort Blockhouse
 Orange River Station
 Pampoennek Blockhouse
 Prieska Blockhouse
 Riversford Blockhouse
 The Reservoir Blockhouse
 The Stormberg Junction South Blockhouse
 Timeball Hill Blockhouse
 The Warrenton Railway Bridge Blockhouse
 Warmbaths Blockhouse
 Witkop Blockhouse

See also

 South African Heritage Resources Agency
 South African National Museum of Military History
 Provincial heritage site (South Africa)
 Military history of South Africa
 List of castles in Africa
 History of South Africa
 List of castles
 List of forts

References 

 
 

 
Fortifications in South Africa
Castles
South Africa
Second Boer War
Second Anglo-Boer War